Chlosyne cyneas, the black checkerspot, is a species of crescents, checkerspots, anglewings, etc. in the butterfly family Nymphalidae.

The MONA or Hodges number for Chlosyne cyneas is 4507.

References

Further reading

 

cyneas
Articles created by Qbugbot